Friedrich Gernsheim (17 July 1839 – 10 September 1916) was a German composer, conductor and pianist.

Early life
Gernsheim was born in Worms.  He was given his first musical training at home under his mother's care, then starting from the age of seven under Worms' musical director, Louis Liebe, a former pupil of Louis Spohr.  His father, a prominent Jewish physician, moved the family to Frankfurt am Main in the aftermath of the year of revolutions, 1848, where he studied with Edward Rosenhain, brother of Jakob Rosenhain. He made his first public appearance as a concert pianist in 1850 and toured for two seasons, then settled with his family in Leipzig, where he studied piano with Ignaz Moscheles from 1852. He spent the years 1855–1860 in Paris, meeting Gioachino Rossini, Théodore Gouvy, Édouard Lalo and Camille Saint-Saëns.

Career
His travels afterwards took him to Saarbrücken, where in 1861 he took the conductor post vacated by Hermann Levi; to Cologne, where in 1865 Ferdinand Hiller appointed him to the staff of the Conservatory (his pupils there included Engelbert Humperdinck and Carl Lachmund); he then served as musical director of the Philharmonic Society of  Rotterdam, 1874-1890. In the latter year he became a teacher at the Stern Conservatory in Berlin, and in 1897 moved there to teach at the Prussian Academy of Arts, where he was elected to the senate in 1897. In 1877 he married Helene Hernsheim from Karlsruhe.

Gernsheim was a prolific composer, especially of orchestral, chamber and instrumental music, and songs. Some of his works tend to Jewish subject-matter, but Gernsheim rarely made explicit references in his music to Jewish heritage. His third symphony, for example, was based on the legend of the Song of Miriam, but directly inspired by a performance of Handel’s Israel in Egypt. His earlier works show the influence of Schumann, and from 1868, when he first became friendly with Brahms, a Brahmsian influence is very palpable. Gernsheim's four symphonies (the first of which was written before the publication of Brahms' First Symphony) are an interesting example of the reception of Brahmsian style by a sympathetic and talented contemporary.  Gernsheim's last works, most notably his Zu einem Drama (1902), show him moving away from that into something more personal. He died in Berlin.

Due to his Jewish background, his work was banned in Nazi Germany, and his papers and a biography written about him by Karl Holl were removed from music libraries.

Style
According to the few who have studied Friedrich Gernsheim’s music, he is usually categorized as a Romantic composer heavily influenced by Johannes Brahms. While he certainly did learn from the great composer, Gernsheim began his composition career prior to hearing Brahms and his influence was only discovered later. Christopher Fifield suggests that Gernsheim owes his “instrumentation, thematic shapes, accompaniments, and orchestral textures” to both Brahms and Max Bruch. In fact, some believe Gernsheim’s symphonic work to resemble Bruch more than Brahms, but homages to both masters are present in his music. Unlike Bruch, however, Gernsheim is described as having his own “personal melodic language” and was more daring in his harmony, whereas Bruch was largely inspired by folk songs.

After the premier of Gernsheim’s first symphony, which predated Brahms’s first symphony, Gernsheim’s themes were praised for possessing an “abundance of beautiful details,” many of which pass by the listener unnoticed in the first hearing. The same critic claimed that his treatment of instrumentation “reveals a very talented hand,” and many listeners preferred Gernsheim’s symphonies to those by Brahms. Bruch, for one, considered Gernsheim’s first symphony a work that “ranks without question among the best that has been written in this genre in our time.” He even called Brahms’s symphonies overrated and agreed with critics in that Gernsheim demonstrated a great advantage over those of his contemporaries: “its excellent orchestration.”

On the other hand, some of Gernsheim’s critics and even his teacher, Ignaz Moscheles, said he fell into the same trap Bruckner did by composing short melodies or themes that were already too complicated to develop further. Granted, some of Gernsheim’s themes can seem fleeting and disconnected since he often inserts short, transitional motives, but he achieves a high degree of contrast between themes through his use of transitions and silence. Moscheles also admitted, after playing Gernsheim’s first piano quartet, that he composed “with great agility in the manner of Schumann” and the Romantic style of the time, but thought his clear motives were often sacrificed to “artificial counterpoint.” Many theorists and music critics today agree with this evaluation of the composer, saying his symphonies and other works tend to be discursive, but all admire his talent in orchestration and achievements in chamber music. In chamber settings, he wrote particularly well for strings and presented his most focused ideas and logical developments. His late orchestral works, such as his fourth symphony and the tone poem Zu Einem Drama, demonstrate the maturity reached in his chamber music but on a larger scale.

Throughout his career, Gernsheim proved himself a somewhat conservative composer and a faithful student of Classical form. He composed under the belief that every measure should be “essential and inevitable,” which is undoubtedly present in his later works. The discursive ideas with small-scale developments that brought him criticism are often used to add variety within traditional structures. His music that follows sonata-allegro form, for example, usually include at least three expositional themes that establish structural patterns and allow him to undermine them. Common threads and relationships can be traced through his many themes, however, and Gernsheim uses them to achieve a certain balance in his music. Alexander Ringer calls this virtue “Gediegenheit,” or “decency and solidarity,” a principle that served as a constant guide in Gernsheim’s musical and personal life.

Selected works  (excerpted from worklist)
Of Gernsheim's music, the symphonies, the cello concerto, the first cello sonata, the piano trios, two of the piano quartets, the two piano quintets, the violin sonatas, and the second string quartet have been recorded.

Orchestral works

Symphonies
Kinder-Sinfonie for strings, piano and children's instruments (1851)
Symphony in E major (completed 1857, Paris. 291 pp. unpublished manuscript.)
Symphony No. 1 in G minor, Op. 32, 1875
Symphony No. 2 in E major, Op. 46, 1882
Symphony No. 3 in C minor ('Miriam' or 'Mirjam'), Op. 54, 1887
Symphony No. 4 in B major, Op. 62, 1895

Other orchestral pieces
2 Overtures for Orchestra (1849, 1854)
Waldmeisters Brautfahrt, Overture, Op. 13 (pub. by 1873)
Zu einem drama, Op. 82 (released on the Sterling label in a performance by Klaus Arp and the SWR Radio Orchestra).

Concertante works
Piano Concerto in C minor, Op. 16
Fantasy Piece for violin with orchestra, Op. 33
Violin Concerto No. 1 in D major, Op. 42
Divertimento in E for flute and string orchestra (or chamber ensemble), Op. 53
Recorded and released by the British label Hyperion in its 'Romantic Cello Concerto' series, played by the Rundfunk-Sinfonieorchester Berlin, conducted by Hannu Lintu, with Alban Gerhardt as soloist).)
Violin Concerto No. 2 in F, Op. 86
In memoriam: ein Klagegesang für Streichorchester und Orgel, Op. 91 (1915)

Chamber music
Introduction and Allegro appassionato, Op. 38 
String trio in G major, 1900 (First edition Amadeus Verlag, 2013)
String Quartet No. 1 in C minor, Op. 25 (cpo 777 387-2, Diogenes Quartett, 2019)
String Quartet No. 2 in A minor, Op. 31, 1875 (recorded on Audite)
String Quartet No. 3 in F major, Op. 51, 1886 (cpo 777 387-2, Diogenes Quartett, 2019)
String Quartet No. 4 in E minor, Op. 66
String Quartet No. 5 in A major, Op. 83 (Republished recently by Walter Wollenweber-Verlag, pub. originally ca 1911.)
Piano Quartet No. 1 in E, Op. 6
Piano Quartet No. 2 in C minor, Op. 20 (performed in 2003. Pub. ca. 1870.)
Piano Quartet No. 3 in F major, Op. 47, 1883
Piano Quintet No. 1 in D minor, Op. 35
Piano Quintet No. 2 in B minor, Op. 63, pub. ca. 1897 (definitely by 1898 - see review )
String Quintet No. 1 in D major, Op. 9
String Quintet No. 2 in E major, Op. 89 (premiered in February 1916 and mentioned in the Neue Zeitschrift that year. Two-cello quintet. Given its modern premiere in 2003 along with his string trio op. 74.)
Violin Sonata No. 1 in C minor, Op. 4, pub. ca. 1864
Violin Sonata No. 2 in C, Op. 50, pub. ca. 1885
Violin Sonata No. 3 in F, Op. 64, pub. ca. 1898
Violin Sonata No. 4 in G, Op. 85
Early violin sonata (E minor, 1857)
Piano Trio No. 1 in F, Op. 28
Piano Trio No. 2 in B, Op. 37
Two other piano trios, in manuscript (search at the Altenberg Trio site . the Trio in B major, Op. 37 is in their repertoire.)
Cello Sonata No. 1 in D minor, Op. 12
Cello Sonata No. 2 in E minor, Op. 79
Cello Sonata No. 3 in E minor, Op. 87 (1914)

Choral works
Wächterlied, for chorus and orchestra, Op. 7 
Salamis, for men's chorus and orchestra, Op. 10 
Nibelungen wiederfahrt, Op. 73
Nornen wiegenlied, Op. 65
Agrippina, Op. 77

Piano pieces
Piano Sonata in F minor, Op. 1 (published 1860)
Piano Sonatas in D minor, D minor and E (1854, 1858, 1859)

Organ pieces
Fantasy and Fugue for Organ, Op. 76

References

Further reading
 Holl, Karl (1928). Friedrich Gernsheim: Leben, Erscheinung und Werk. Berlin: Breitkopf & Härtel.
 Koch, Dr. Hans-Oskar. Notes to the recording on Arte-Nova of the Complete Symphonies of Friedrich Gernsheim.
 Ringer, Alexander (1980). Friedrich Gernsheim (1839-1916) and the Lost Generation, Music Judaica, 3.1, 5741/1980-1. pp. 1–13.
Green, Janet M. and Josephine Thrall (2016). "Friedrich Gernsheim", in: The American History and Encyclopedia of Music, Vol. 9, p. 908.

External links 
Friedrich Gernsheim’s String Quartet No. 2 , Piano Trio No.2 & Piano Quintet No.1 sound-bites with discussion of works
Detailed biography and worklist on the page of an association for Jewish culture in his hometown (in German, cf. #2 there)
Detailed biography, worklist and discography by François-Emmanuel de Wasseige on the French website musicologie.org (in French)
Jewish Encyclopedia biography

1839 births
1916 deaths
19th-century classical composers
20th-century classical composers
German Romantic composers
German male conductors (music)
German classical pianists
Male classical pianists
19th-century German Jews
Jewish classical composers
People from Worms, Germany
German music educators
People from Rhenish Hesse
German male classical composers
20th-century German composers
19th-century classical pianists
19th-century German composers
German pianists
German male pianists
20th-century German conductors (music)
20th-century German male musicians
19th-century German male musicians